The United Nationalities League for Democracy (UNLD) was a political alliance in Myanmar.

History
Following the reintroduction of multi-party democracy after the 8888 Uprising, the UNLD was formed in 1988 as an alliance of 25 ethnic-based parties, including:
Arakan League for Democracy
Arakan People's United Organisation
Arakanese Peace and Human Rights Party
Chin National League for Democracy
Democratic League for the National Races of Shan State
Democratic Organisation for Kayan National Unity
Highlander's Democratic Party
Kachin National Congress
Kamans National League for Democracy
Karen State National Organisation
Kayah State Nationalities League for Democracy
Lahu National Development Party
Mon National Democratic Front
Mro or Khami National Solidarity Organisation
Shan Nationalities League for Democracy
Shan State Kachin Democratic Party
Union Karen League
Pa-O National Organisation
Ta'ang National League for Democracy
Zomi National Congress

The alliance aligned itself with the National League for Democracy in 1990. It contested 247 seats in the 1990 general elections. Under the UNLD banner it received 0.07% of the vote, winning one seat; U Htaung Kho Htan (a member of the Hill Tribe Democratic Party) in Tamu. In total UNLD member won 67 seats.

The alliance was dissolved by the military government in 1992.

References

Defunct political party alliances in Myanmar
1988 establishments in Burma
Political parties established in 1988
1992 disestablishments in Myanmar
Political parties disestablished in 1992